Lucius Oliver Allen, Jr. (born September 26, 1947) is an American former professional basketball player. He is one of only a select few players to have won at least one high school state championship, collegiate national championship, and NBA championship.

Early life
Allen was born and raised in Kansas City, Kansas and played basketball for Wyandotte High School. During this time, he was a prep All-American player under head coach Walter Shublom and was named consensus first-team all-state as a junior and senior as he led Wyandotte to back-to-back Class AA state championships in 1964 and 1965.

College career
During his freshman year, Allen scored the very first points ever scored in Pauley Pavilion history during the annual freshman vs varsity game. During that game, the freshmen defeated the varsity 75-60. During his freshman season, the UCLA freshmen team finished the season undefeated and Allen averaged 22.4 points per game. During his sophomore year, he played on the varsity team and averaged 15.5 points per game while helping lead the Bruins to an undefeated 30-0 season and the 1967 National Championship. Allen was named to the NCAA Championship and Regional All-Tournament teams. During his junior year, he averaged 15.1 points per game and helped the Bruins win a second consecutive NCAA Championship while playing alongside Lew Alcindor. He was named to the NCAA All-Tournament team and was selected as a second-team All-American.

Professional career
Following his junior year, Allen entered the 1969 NBA draft and was selected 3rd overall by the Seattle SuperSonics. As a member of the 1971 Milwaukee Bucks team, which also featured Alcindor, Allen earned an NBA championship ring. They would both return to the NBA Finals in 1974 before losing to the Boston Celtics in 7 games. This was Allen’s last season in Milwaukee, during which he arguably played his greatest professional game, a 39 point and 6 assist effort during a loss against the Detroit Pistons on January 2. He also played with Alcindor—now known as Kareem Abdul-Jabbar—for two seasons (1975–77) in Los Angeles, but did not win a championship in either of those years. Allen was traded the following season to the Kansas City Kings, winning the division championship in 1979, and retired from basketball after that season.

Allen played 10 years in the NBA for four teams. His highest scoring average was 19.1 points per game, during the 1974–75 season. Part of the way through that season he was traded to the Los Angeles Lakers after playing with the Milwaukee Bucks since the 1970–71 season.

Regular season

|-
| style="text-align:left;"| 
| style="text-align:left;"| Seattle
|81 ||  || 22.4 || .442 ||  || .731 || 2.6 || 4.2 ||  ||  || 9.8
|-
| style="text-align:left;background:#afe6ba;"|†
| style="text-align:left;"| Milwaukee
| 61 ||  || 19.0 || .447 ||  || .700 || 2.5 || 2.6 ||  ||  || 7.1
|-
| style="text-align:left;"| 
| style="text-align:left;"| Milwaukee
| 80 ||  || 29.0 || .50.5 ||  || .764 || 3.2 || 4.2 ||  ||  || 13.5
|-
| style="text-align:left;"| 
| style="text-align:left;"| Milwaukee
| 80 ||  || 33.7 || .484 ||  || .715 || 3.5 || 5.3 ||  ||  || 15.5
|-
| style="text-align:left;"| 
| style="text-align:left;"| Milwaukee
| 72 ||  || 33.2 || .495 ||  || .788 || 4.0 || 5.2 || 1.9 || 0.3 || 17.6
|-
| style="text-align:left;"| 
| style="text-align:left;"| Milwaukee/L.A. Lakers
| 66 ||  || 35.7 || .437 ||  || .778 || 4.2 || 5.6 || 2.1 || 0.4 || 19.1
|-
| style="text-align:left;"| 
| style="text-align:left;"| L.A. Lakers
| 76 ||  || 31.4 || .459 ||  || .776 || 2.8 || 4.7 || 1.3 || 0.3 || 14.7
|-
| style="text-align:left;"| 
| style="text-align:left;"| L.A. Lakers
| 78 ||  || 31.8 || .456 ||  || .774 || 3.2 || 5.2 || 1.5 || 0.2 || 14.6
|-
| style="text-align:left;"| 
| style="text-align:left;"| KC Kings
| 77 ||  || 27.9 || .441 ||  || .791 || 3.0 || 4.7 || 1.2 || 0.4 || 11.9
|-
| style="text-align:left;"| 
| style="text-align:left;"| KC Kings
| 31 ||  || 13.3 || .397 ||  || .576 || 1.5 || 1.4 || 0.7 || 0.2 || 5.1
|- class="sortbottom"
| style="text-align:center;" colspan=2| Career
| 702 ||  || 28.7 || .463 ||  || .760 || 3.1 || 4.5 || 1.5 || 0.3 || 13.4
|- class="sortbottom"
| style="text-align:center;" colspan=2| Playoffs
| 18 || 43 || 27.0 || .449 ||  || .756 || 3.1 || 3.3 || 1.1 || 0.3 || 11.8

Later life
After finishing his basketball career, which included a high school state championship, college national championship, and an NBA championship, Allen turned his attention to coaching aspiring players in the Los Angeles area.

Legacy and awards
In 1999, the Topeka Capital-Journal named Lucius Oliver Allen, Jr. of Wyandotte High School in Kansas City, Kansas as the greatest Kansas high school basketball player of the 20th century. New Arena named Allen as the best basketball player of all-time from the State of Kansas. Allen was inducted into the UCLA Hall of Fame in 2000. He was inducted into the Pac-12 Conference men's basketball Hall of Honor on March 16, 2013.

References

External links

1947 births
Living people
African-American basketball players
All-American college men's basketball players
American men's basketball players
Basketball players from Kansas
Kansas City Kings players
Los Angeles Lakers players
Milwaukee Bucks players
Parade High School All-Americans (boys' basketball)
Sacramento Kings announcers
Seattle SuperSonics draft picks
Seattle SuperSonics players
Shooting guards
Sportspeople from Kansas City, Kansas
UCLA Bruins men's basketball players
21st-century African-American people
20th-century African-American sportspeople